Albert Clarence "Bert" Armstrong (26 February 1890 – 15 August 1969) was an Australian rules footballer who played with Essendon in the Victorian Football League (VFL).

Armstrong, a full-forward, was recruited from North Melbourne, then playing in the Victorian Football Association. He was Essendon's leading goal-kicker in 1910, his first season, with 30 goals.
 In 1911 he kicked 25 goals, which were enough to finish equal second in the goal-kicking, behind his elder brother Lou Armstrong. He twice kicked six goals in a game for Essendon, against Melbourne in 1910 at the MCG and Collingwood the following year at East Melbourne. Injury kept him out of both Essendon's 1911 and 1912 premiership teams and sciatica problems meant he didn't play at all in 1913. Armstrong crossed to Essendon Association during the 1914 season. He also played for Brighton during his career.

References

1890 births
Australian rules footballers from Victoria (Australia)
Essendon Football Club players
Essendon Association Football Club players
Brighton Football Club players
North Melbourne Football Club (VFA) players
1969 deaths